Andrzej Marcelin Liss (9 June 1950 – 21 January 2019) was a Polish politician.

Career
He was elected to the Sejm on 25 September 2005, getting 5674 votes in 25 Gdańsk district as a candidate from the Law and Justice list.

He was also a member of Sejm 2001-2005.

See also
Members of Polish Sejm 2005-2007

References

External links
Andrzej Liss - parliamentary page - includes declarations of interest, voting record, and transcripts of speeches.

1950 births
2019 deaths
People from Pelplin
Members of the Polish Sejm 2005–2007
Members of the Polish Sejm 2001–2005
Law and Justice politicians